The 1934 United States Senate election in Florida was held on November 6, 1934. 

Incumbent Senator Park Trammell ran for a fourth term in office. Trammell failed to achieve a majority in the June 5 primary election, but he narrowly defeated Claude Pepper in a run-off on June 26. Trammell won the November general election without an opponent.

Democratic primary

Candidates
 Charles A. Mitchell, attorney
 Claude Pepper, attorney and former State Representative 
 James F. Sikes, State Senator
 Park Trammell, incumbent Senator since 1917
 Hortense K. Wells, Florida Democratic Committeewoman

Results

Runoff

General election

Results

Aftermath
Senator Trammell died during his fourth term in 1936.

Pepper ran for Florida's other Senate seat in 1936 and won without an opponent.

See also 
 1934 United States Senate elections

References 

1934
Florida
United States Senate
Single-candidate elections